Wise County is the name of two counties in the United States:

 Wise County, Texas
 Wise County, Virginia